Richmond upon Thames in the south west of Greater London has more parks, open spaces and nature reserves than any other London borough.

These include:
 Kew Gardens
 three Royal Parks – Richmond Park (which includes the Isabella Plantation), Bushy Park (which includes the Upper Lodge Water Gardens)  and Hampton Court Park
 English Heritage's Marble Hill Park in  Twickenham
 Thames Water's Sunnyside Reservoir
 The WWT London Wetland Centre

There are over 100 parks and open spaces within the borough's boundary and 21 miles of river frontage. Many of the open spaces were village greens.

The main  parks and open spaces managed by Richmond upon Thames Borough Council are:

The Crane Riverside Park, linking the boroughs of Richmond and Hounslow, is one of 11 parks in Greater London selected for renovation funds by a public vote. In 2009 the park received £400,000 towards better footpaths, more lighting, refurbished public toilets and new play areas for children.

References

External links
Alphabetical list of Richmond parks and open spaces
Parks and Green Spaces in Richmond